The Bishop Gore School is a secondary school in Swansea in Wales, founded on 14 September 1682 by Hugh Gore (1613–1691), Bishop of Waterford and Lismore. It is situated in Sketty, close to Singleton Park and Swansea University. In December 2013 the school was ranked in the second highest of five bands by the Welsh Government, based on performance in exams, value added performance, disadvantaged pupils' performance, and attendance.

History

Grammar school
The school was endowed and established in 1682, as a Free Grammar School by Hugh Gore, Bishop of Waterford and Lismore, for "the gratuitous instruction of twenty boys, sons of the most indigent burgesses, and in the event of a dissolution of the corporation, to sons of the poorest inhabitants of the town." Initially located in historic Goat Street (on a site now part of Princess Way in the city centre), it has since known several names and locations. In September 1853 the school, by then named the Swansea Grammar School for Boys, moved to Mount Pleasant into a new building designed by the architect Thomas Taylor. The building was extended in 1869 to a design by Benjamin Bucknall.

From 1895 the site was shared with the newly created Swansea Intermediate and Technical School for Boys (later the co-educational Swansea Technical College). Under the provisions of the 1902 Education Act the running of both institutions was taken over by Swansea Council.

During World War II the buildings were largely destroyed by incendiary bombs. Discussions about the rebuilding of the site led to the decision to move the Grammar School to a new site elsewhere in Swansea and in 1952 it relocated to newly built premises located in De La Beche Road, Sketty, at which point it was renamed Bishop Gore Grammar School and subsequently, from 1970, Bishop Gore Comprehensive School. A large extension was built in the 1970s and further Design and Technology extensions in the 1990s.

Comprehensive
Until 1970, Bishop Gore was an all-boys grammar school, then it merged with the girls' grammar school Glanmôr and Townhill Secondary School to become Bishop Gore Co-educational Comprehensive school in 1971.

School today 

, Bishop Gore has 1,002 male and female students aged 11–18, including 112 in the sixth form. The sixth form has a separate lounge, facilities and uniform. The headteacher is Helen Burgum (the school's first female headteacher, appointed September 2017). Set at the head of Singleton Park, close to the village of Sketty and the seafront, Bishop Gore is built around two quadrangles. The red brick building has in the centre the second largest hall in Swansea, second only to the Brangwyn Hall. Each pupil is assigned to a house: Caswell, Langland, Bracelet, Rotherslade or Limeslade (named after beaches on the nearby Gower peninsula), which they retain throughout their time at the school. Highlights of the school year include the Eisteddfod, the inter-house sports tournaments, the productions by Bishop Gore Theatre Company, and the end-of-year balls for the senior students.

In January 2010, an inspection report was published which awarded Bishop Gore the highest possible grades in all categories.  As a result of this the school was featured as a 'best practice' case study by Estyn and was named in the chief inspector's annual report – being the only secondary school in Wales to achieve this recognition.

Dylan Thomas 

The most famous alumnus of Bishop Gore is almost certainly the poet, playwright and author Dylan Thomas (1914–1953). His father, David John (D. J.) Thomas was senior English master at the school, then known as Swansea Grammar School. Not a distinguished pupil, he nonetheless gained attention through publishing his first poem in 1926, "The Song Of The Mischievous Dog" and in 1928 winning the school's annual one-mile race. He left in 1931 to begin work at The South Wales Daily Post as a junior reporter.

In 1988 the main surviving structure of the 1869 school building was renamed the Dylan Thomas Building in honour of its former pupil.

Old Goreans 

Notable Old Goreans have included:
 Martin Amis, writer
 Donald Anderson, Baron Anderson of Swansea, politician
 Gareth Armstrong, actor
 Henry Bruce, 1st Baron Aberdare, politician, Home Secretary 1868–73
 Prof Sir John Cadogan, CBE, President of the Royal Society of Chemistry
 Rt Rev Graham Chadwick, bishop and anti-apartheid campaigner
 Hywel Davies, cardiologist and author
 Prof Sir Sam Edwards FRS, physicist and university administrator
 Paul Ferris, writer
 Charles Fisher, journalist
 Brian Flowers, Baron Flowers, FRS, physicist
 Neville George, geologist
 Sir Alex Gordon, CBE, architect
 Sir William Grove, scientist and judge
 Rt Rev Llewellyn Henry Gwynne, Bishop of Egypt and the Sudan
 Aneurin Hughes, EU diplomat
 Alfred Janes, artist
 John Gwyn Jeffreys, FRS, conchologist
 Daniel Jones, composer
 Ernest Jones, neurologist and psychoanalyst, biographer of Sigmund Freud
 Mervyn Jones, Governor of the Turks and Caicos Islands
 Peter Jones, broadcaster
 Sir Archie Lamb KBE CMG DFC, diplomat
 Mervyn Levy, artist and critic
 Prof Patrick McGorry AO, psychiatrist, Australian of the Year.
 John Metcalf, composer
 David Miles, economist
 Prof Dewi Zephaniah Phillips philosopher
 Colin Phipps, geologist and Labour MP
 Dylan Thomas, writer
 Wynford Vaughan-Thomas, writer

International Rugby players
Several Old Goreans have played international rugby, for the Wales national rugby union team or the Wales women's national rugby union team
Paul Arnold
Roger Blyth
Stuart Davies
Alun Wyn Jones, captain of Wales
Haydn Mainwaring
Richie Pugh, Wales Rugby sevens captain at the 2006 Commonwealth Games
Idwal Rees
Belinda Trotter, played in the first Welsh women's team in 1987.
Geoff Wheel

See also
 The Kardomah Gang, 1930s Swansea literary and cultural circle, several members of which attended the school

References

External links 
 Bishop Gore School Homepage
 Profile of Natalie Richards 2008 Welsh New Teacher of the Year in the Guardian
 Guardian obituary of Charles Fisher and information on the Old Gorians Kardomah Boys Circle
 A History of Swansea, with details about the school's founding

Secondary schools in Swansea
1682 establishments in Wales
Educational institutions established in the 1680s